Yapı Kredi Yayınları (Yapi Kredi Publications in English) is one of the biggest publishing houses in Turkey. Based in Istanbul and active since 1992, as of end of 2013 it has published 4000 titles in philosophy, literature, the arts, and children's books. It has printed more than 2 million copies in 2013.

It is a member of the Turkish Publishers Association.

References

External links
 YKY Official Yapi Kredi Publishing website

Publishing companies of Turkey
Mass media companies of Turkey
Mass media in Istanbul
Book publishing companies of Turkey